Mite Skerry is a small island in the south part of the entrance to Lystad Bay, off Horseshoe Island, Antarctica. It was named by UK Antarctic Place-Names Committee in 1958; the name is descriptive of its small size.

References

Islands of Graham Land
Fallières Coast